Hampshire is a rural municipality in Prince Edward Island, Canada. It was incorporated in 1974 and has a population of 339.

Demographics 

References 

Communities in Queens County, Prince Edward Island
Rural municipalities in Prince Edward Island